Isoperla marmorata, the red stripetail, is a species of green-winged stonefly in the family Perlodidae. It is found in North America.

References

 DeWalt R, Cao Y, Tweddale T, Grubbs S, Hinz L, Pessino M, Robinson J (2012). "Ohio USA stoneflies (Insecta, Plecoptera): species richness estimation, distribution of functional niche traits, drainage affiliations, and relationships to other states". . ZooKeys 178: 1-26.

Further reading

 

Perlodidae